Vadivukkarasi is an Indian actress. She made her acting debut in the Tamil film Sigappu Rojakkal (1978) and has acted in more than 350 films in Tamil, Telugu, Kannada and Malayalam and 40 television serials in Tamil. Film director A. P. Nagarajan is her maternal uncle.

Personal life 
Vadivukarasi's maternal uncle is director A. P. Nagarajan, and was named after his film Vadivukku Valai Kappu. She has one daughter Padmapriya.

Career 
Vadivukarasi's first job was as a primary school teacher. Due to her struggling family situation she chose to do different jobs. She made her debut in Tamil film Sigappu Rojakkal. Her first movie was Kanni Paruvathile. She has played various characters, playing the lead, supporting as well as antagonistic roles. In the early 2000s, she started acting in television serials.

She has done 350 movies and featured in more than 40 television serials.

Filmography

Tamil 

 Sigappu Rojakkal (1978) - Debut Film 
 Shri Kanchi Kamakshi (1978)
 Kanni Paruvathile (1979)
 Enippadigal (1979)
 Porter Ponnusami (1979)
 Deiveega Raagangal (1980)
 Kannil Theriyum Kathaikal (1980)
 Aayiram Vaasal Idhayam (1980)
 Malargindra Paruvathile (1980)
 Naan Naaney Than (1980)
 Yaagasaalai (1980)
 Azhaithal Varuven (1980)
 Panam Penn Pasam (1980)
 Madhavi Vandhal (1980)
 Kaalam Orunaal Maarum (1981)
 Vaa Kanna Vaa (1982)
 Ethanai Konam Ethanai Parvai (1982)
 Kelviyum Naane Pathilum Naane (1982) 
 Nadamadum Silaigal (1982)
 Kanne Radha (1982)
 Metti (1982)
 Nizhal Thedum Nenjangal  (1982)
 Bhagavathipuram Railway Gate (1983)
 Sandhippu (1983)
 Theerppu En Kaiyil (1984)
 Raja Veettu Kannukkutty (1984)
 Shanthi Muhurtham (1984)
 Vaidehi Kathirunthal (1984)
 Oh Maane Maane (1984)
 Unnai Vidamatten (1985)
 Santhosha Kanavukal (1985)
 Ilamai (1985)
 Engal Kural (1985)
 Muthal Mariyathai (1985)
 Neethiyin Marupakkam (1985)
 Padikkadavan (1985) 
 Mr. Bharath (1986)
 Selvakku (1986)
 Maragatha Veenai (1986)
 Nambinar Keduvathillai (1986)
 Annai En Dheivam (1986)
 Kannukku Mai Ezhuthu (1986)
 Aruvadai Naal (1986) - Vadivu
 Velundu Vinaiyillai (1987)
 Dhoorathu Pachai (1987)
 Anjatha Singam (1987)
 Paruva Ragam (1987) 
 Penmani Aval Kanmani (1988) 
 Thambi Thanga Kambi  (1988)
 En Thamizh En Makkal (1988)
 Sathya (1988) 
 Uzhaithu Vaazha Vendum (1988)
 Vaai Kozhuppu (1989)
 Varusham Padhinaaru (1989) 
 Oru Thottil Sabadham (1989)
 Unnai Solli Kutramillai (1990) 
 En Uyir Thozhan (1990)
 Vedikkai En Vadikkai (1990)
 Enkitta Mothathe (1990)
 Thalattu Ketkuthamma (1991) 
 Nenjamundu Nermaiyundu (1991)
 Naane Varuven (1992)
 Chinna Pasanga Naanga (1992)
 Chinna Marumagal (1992)
 Kizhakku Veedhi (1992)
 Pattathu Raani (1992) 
 Abhirami (1992) 
 Chinna Kannamma (1993) 
 Maharasan (1993)
 Pettredutha Pillai (1993)
 Pass Mark (1993)
 Porantha Veeda Puguntha Veeda (1993) 
 Rajadhi Raja Raja Kulothunga Raja Marthanda Raja Gambeera Kathavaraya Krishna Kamarajan (1993)
 Ravanan (1994) 
 Veera (1994)
 Sathyavan (1994) 
 Karuththamma (1994)
 Thai Maaman (1994) 
 Karuththamma (1994) 
 Vanaja Girija (1994) 
 Muthu Kaalai (1995) 
 Thottil Kuzhandhai (1995)
 Thondan (1995)
 Amman (1995)
 Rajavin Parvaiyile (1995) 
 Mannai Thottu Kumbidanum (1995)
 Thirumbi Paar (1996)
 Kizhakku Mugam (1996) 
 Vaanmathi (1996) 
 Kaalam Maari Pochu (1996) 
 Rajali (1996)
 Sundara Purushan (1996)
 Enakkoru Magan Pirappan (1996)
 Alexander (1996) 
 Vetri Vinayagar (1996) 
 Nalla Manasukkaran (1997)
 Periya Thambi (1997) 
 Mannava (1997) 
 Nandhini (1997) 
 Arunachalam (1997)
 Pongalo Pongal (1997) 
 Udhavikku Varalaamaa (1998) 
 Dhinamdhorum (1998) 
 Velai (1998)
 Kavalai Padathe Sagodhara (1998)
 Dharma (1998) 
 Poonthottam (1998)
 Nee Varuvai Ena (1998)
 Kannathal (1998)
 Thalaimurai (1998) 
 Maya (1999) 
 Annan (1999)
 Annan Thangachi (1999) 
 Jayam 
 Padayappa (1999) 
 Poovellam Kettuppar (1999)
 Kanmani Unakkaga (1999)
 Kudumba Sangili (1999)
 Karisakattu Poove (2000)
 Snegithiye (2000)
 Magalirkkaga (2000)
 Sonnal Thaan Kaadhala (2001) 
 Maayan (2001) 
 Thavasi (2001) 
 Parthale Paravasam (2001) 
 Kasi (2001) 
 Punnagai Desam (2002) 
 Samurai (2002) 
 Samasthanam (2002) 
 Solla Marandha Kadhai (2002)
 Guruvamma (2002)
 Aalukkoru Aasai (2003) 
 Paarai (2003)
 Galatta Ganapathy (2003)
 Engal Anna (2004) 
 Kadhale Jayam (2004)
 Kannamma (2005)
 Sevvel (2005)
 Pesuvoma (2005)
 Iyappa Saamy (2006)
 Thirudi (2006)
 Sivaji (2007) 
 Valluvan Vasuki (2008)
 Aachariyar (2008)
 Munnar (2009)
 En Kanmani Priya (2010)
 Oththa Veedu (2011) 
 Anbulla Manvizhiye (2012)
 Neerparavai (2012) 
 Unakku 20 Enakku 40 (2013)
 Anjal Thurai (2013)
 Sokku Sundaram (2014)
 Idam Porul Yaeval (2015) 
 Puli (2015)
 Apoorva Mahaan (2015)
 Sowkarpettai (2016)
 Iraivi (2016) 
 Ka Ka Ka Po (2016)
 Kollidam (2016)
 Veera Vamsam (2017)
 Aakkam (2017)
 Namma Kadha (2017)
 Silukkuvarupatti Singam (2018)
 Peranbu (2019)
 Kanne Kalaimaane (2019)
 Jagame Thandhiram (2021) 
 Jananayagam Virpanaikku Alla (2022)
 Viruman (2022)

Telugu

Malayalam

Kannada

Dubbing Artist

Television
Serials

Shows

References

External links
 

Living people
Indian film actresses
Indian television actresses
Actresses in Tamil cinema
Actresses in Telugu cinema
Actresses from Chennai
20th-century Indian actresses
21st-century Indian actresses
Actresses in Tamil television
1958 births